Musa Audu (born 18 June 1980) is a Nigerian athlete who specializes in 400 metres. He is notable for winning the bronze medal in the 2004 Olympics 4 x 400 metres relay as part of the Nigerian team and the silver medal in the 2003 All-Africa Games 4 x 400 metres relay as part of the Nigerian team too.

References

External links
 
http://www.olympic.org/

Nigerian male sprinters
1980 births
Living people
Athletes (track and field) at the 2004 Summer Olympics
Olympic athletes of Nigeria
Olympic bronze medalists for Nigeria
Medalists at the 2004 Summer Olympics
Olympic bronze medalists in athletics (track and field)
African Games silver medalists for Nigeria
African Games medalists in athletics (track and field)
Athletes (track and field) at the 2003 All-Africa Games